The Cuban gambusia (Gambusia punctata) is a species of freshwater fish.  It is a member of the family Poeciliidae of order Cyprinodontiformes, and is the type species of its genus. It is native to Cuba, inhabiting primarily stagnant lakes or ponds and slow-moving streams. A carnivorous surface feeder, it occurs in shoals near the shoreline.

This species has the terminal, upward-facing mouth typical of surface feeders, and a protruding belly. It is of plain coloration with a dark lateral stripe. Males reach a maximum overall length around 5.5 cm, with females reaching about 8.5 cm.

References
 
 

Gambusia
Live-bearing fish
Ovoviviparous fish
Fish described in 1854
Gambusia, Cuban
Freshwater fish of Cuba